The Bay Area Panthers are a professional indoor football team based in San Jose, California. They are a member of the Indoor Football League (IFL) and were to begin play in 2020 at Oakland Arena as the Oakland Panthers. Due the onset of the COVID-19 pandemic, the Panthers' inaugural season was cancelled and then the team withdrew from the following 2021 season. Prior to the 2022 season, the Panthers announced they would instead play their home games at the SAP Center in San Jose and were renamed after the Bay Area.

The Panthers are co-owned by Oakland native and NFL All-Pro running back, Marshawn Lynch, and by Roy Choi, who also owns the IFL's Cedar Rapids River Kings and San Diego Strike Force. The Panthers are the Bay Area's first arena/indoor football team since the San Jose SaberCats, who played in the Arena Football League from  until , and again from  until , winning four ArenaBowl championships.

History

With the scheduled departure of the National Football League's Oakland Raiders relocation to Las Vegas in 2020 and the Golden State Warriors move to San Francisco in the 2019–20 season, on April 17, 2019, it was first reported that Roy Choi was in talks to bring an expansion Indoor Football League (IFL) team to Oakland for the 2020 season. Choi had previously purchased the Cedar Rapids River Kings and launched the expansion San Diego Strike Force in the IFL. The Panthers were officially announced as an IFL expansion team on September 10, 2019, along with their logo, color scheme, and coaching staff by co-owners Roy Choi and former NFL All-Pro running back Marshawn Lynch. The team planned to play out the Warriors' former home, the Oakland Arena. The Panthers' name references the indigenous Bay Area cougar, Oakland's involvement in the rise of the Black Panther Party in the 1960s, and the blockbuster Oscar-winning Marvel Studios movie Black Panther, directed by Oakland native Ryan Coogler. A team of the same name had originally been announced to play in the proposed Freedom Football League in December 2018, though no news had come from that league after the initial announcement. Because of the rising cost of living in the Bay Area, the Panthers stated they would provide lodging and meals to their players in addition to their regular salary. The team hired Kurt Bryan, best known for devising the A-11 offense, as their inaugural head coach.

However, the 2020 IFL season was curtailed in the midst of the COVID-19 pandemic before the Panthers could play a game. After initially announcing it would return in 2021, the team subsequently also withdrew from the 2021 season due to the on-going restrictions during the pandemic. On August 16, 2021, the team held a press conference to announce it would not play in Oakland, instead relocating to the SAP Center in San Jose, California, as the Bay Area Panthers without ever playing a game in Oakland.

Current roster

Current staff

Broadcasting
On February 27, 2020, it was announced that the radio home of the team would be KNBR AM 1050 out of San Mateo. KBCW broadcasts all home games on television. Dave Lewis is the play by play voice on the television broadcasts with Arena Football League Hall of Famer Darren Arbet on color commentary. Scott Reiss calls the games on radio.

References

External links
 

American football teams in the San Francisco Bay Area
Indoor Football League teams
Sports teams in Oakland, California
American football teams established in 2019
2019 establishments in California
Sports teams in San Jose, California